Tettigidea armata is a species in the family Tetrigidae ("pygmy grasshoppers"), in the order Orthoptera ("grasshoppers, crickets, katydids"). The species is known generally as the "armored pygmy grasshopper", "armoured grouse locust", or "spined grouse locust".
It is found in North America.

References

Further reading
 Arnett, Ross H. (2000). American Insects: A Handbook of the Insects of America North of Mexico. CRC Press.
 Capinera J.L, Scott R.D., Walker T.J. (2004). Field Guide to Grasshoppers, Katydids, and Crickets of the United States. Cornell University Press.
 Otte, Daniel (1997). "Tetrigoidea and Tridactyloidea (Orthoptera: Caelifera)". Orthoptera Species File 6, 261.

Tetrigidae
Insects described in 1895